Lily of the Nile is a common name for several plants and may refer to:
Agapanthus praecox
Zantedeschia aethiopica